The 1996 Campionati Internazionali di Sicilia was a men's tennis tournament played on outdoor clay courts in Palermo, Italy that was part of the World Series of the 1996 ATP Tour. It was the 18th edition of the tournament and took place from 23 September until 29 September 1996. Unseeded Karim Alami won the singles title.

Finals

Singles

 Karim Alami defeated  Adrian Voinea 7–5, 2–1 retired
 It was Alami's 2nd singles title of the year and the 2nd and last of his career.

Doubles

 Andrew Kratzmann /  Marcos Ondruska defeated  Cristian Brandi /  Emilio Sánchez 7–6, 6–4
 It was Kratzmann's 1st title of the year and the 3rd of his career. It was Ondruska's 2nd title of the year and the 4th of his career.

References

External links
 ITF tournament edition details

Campionati Internazionali di Sicilia
Campionati Internazionali di Sicilia
Campionati Internazionali di Sicilia